Caroline Still Anderson (November 1, 1848 – June 1 or 2, 1919) was an American physician, educator, and activist. She was a pioneering physician in the Philadelphia African-American community and one of the first Black women to become a physician in the United States.

Early life and education 
Caroline Still Anderson was born November 1, 1848, and was the oldest daughter of four to Letitia and William Still. Both of parents were leaders in the American abolitionist movement. Her father led the Philadelphia branch of the Underground Railroad, which began shortly after Caroline's birth. As a child, she attended Mrs. Gordon's Private School, The Friends' Raspberry Alley School, and the Institute for Colored Youth (now Cheyney University of Pennsylvania). Though these schools were costly, her father's lucrative coal industry position allowed him to afford a good education for his daughter. Still was very fortunate to have this opportunity because 19th-century Philadelphia was not a welcoming for most black people, but some black families prospered socially and economically. Being a part of this community Still was protected from the ill-treatment, less fortunate blacks were given and was able to take full advantage of her privileges. Luckily her father strongly valued the importance of education for his daughters and encouraged Caroline to pursue her education seriously, which Caroline did. In 1864, when she finished her primary and secondary education at 15, whereupon she matriculated at Oberlin College as the only black student in her class. She earned her degree in 1868 at the age of 19, as the youngest student in her graduating class. After receiving her Bachelor of Arts degree, she was elected the first black president of the Ladies' Literary Society of Oberlin.

Still married her first husband, Edward A. Wiley, an Oberlin alum and former slave, in a ceremony that took place at their home on December 28, 1869. The wedding was attended by many luminaries of the U.S. antislavery movement, and included a performance by Elizabeth Taylor Greenfield. Two years after her husband's sudden death, in 1875, Still matriculated at the Howard University College of Medicine, though she earned her Doctor of Medicine degree at the Woman's Medical College of Pennsylvania, where she transferred in 1876 and graduated in 1878. Out of her class of 17, only two students were black. While in school, she worked as a drawing and speech teacher to pay her way.

Career 
After she graduated from college, Still moved back to Philadelphia and became a teacher of elocution, drawing, and music, which came to an end in 1875. In 1878 she began her medical career, with an internship at Boston's New England Hospital for Women and Children. Still's initial application was rejected by the racist board of the hospital, and she was appointed only after visiting the city and meeting with the board in person; awed by her talent, they repudiated their earlier decision, appointing Still to the internship by a unanimous vote.

After her internship ended in 1879, she moved back to her hometown, where she opened  a dispensary in her new husband Matthew Anderson's church as well as founding a private medical practice. Now going by Anderson in 1889, she revived her career as an educator, teaching hygiene, physiology, and public speaking while continuing her medical practice. That year, she and her husband founded a vocational and liberal arts school called the Berean Manual Training and Industrial School, Anderson was the assistant principal in addition to her teaching roles. She also practiced medicine at Quaker institutions in Philadelphia. Her career came to an end when she suffered a paralytic stroke in 1914.

Social activism 
In her later years, Anderson became a social activist, working with several organizations in the city of Philadelphia for several causes, including temperance and racial equality. She supported the temperance movement as the president of the Berean Woman's Christian Temperance Union, organized Black YMCAs in Philadelphia, and was a board member of the Home for Aged and Infirm Colored People of Philadelphia. Anderson also was a member of the Philadelphia branch of the Women's Medical Society and the treasurer of the Women's Medical College Alumnae Association.

Anderson's work for the black community of Philadelphia was praised by W. E. B. Du Bois, especially her work with the Berean Institute.

Personal life 
While studying at Oberlin, Still met Edward Wiley and married him in 1869 at the age of 21. In the four years they were married, the couple had two children, Letitia and William. The marriage ended when Wiley died suddenly in 1873. Still married again in 1880, to a minister named Matthew Anderson. Anderson was also an Oberlin alum, along with having studied at Yale University and Princeton University. The Andersons had five children together, three of whom survived to adulthood: Helen, Maude, and Margaret. Anderson died on June 1 or 2, 1919, in Philadelphia of complications from her strokes. She was 70 years old. Multiple dates are given for her death.

References

Further reading

External links 
One of Anderson's papers, a case study of a patient with popliteal aneurysm
Anderson's thesis

1848 births
1919 deaths
20th-century African-American people
20th-century African-American women
African-American physicians
American primary care physicians
American temperance activists
American women physicians
Howard University College of Medicine alumni
Oberlin College alumni
Woman's Medical College of Pennsylvania alumni